Wyatt is a Canadian country music group from Saskatoon, Saskatchewan composed of Scott Patrick (vocals, guitar), Daniel Fortier (vocals, guitar), Bray Hudson (drums) and Cam Ewart (bass). Following the release of a Christmas album, Snowed In, in 2005, Wyatt released their debut album, Hard Road, in 2007. No singles were released from the project because the band "didn't feel it was quite there yet."

In June 2009, Wyatt won Big Dog 92.7's The Next Big Thing talent contest. Their prize included $5,000 cash, a showcase for music industry professionals, career guidance, a trip to the Canadian Country Music Association Awards and the option of having a professional single released to radio. Their single "Ride On" debuted at No. 48 on the Billboard Canadian Country Singles chart in December 2009. A second single, "Questions," reached the Top 40 in May 2010. Both songs are included on Wyatt's second studio album, If I Had a Dollar…, released in June 2010.

Discography

Studio albums

Singles

Music videos

References

External links

Canadian country music groups
Musical groups from Saskatoon
Musical groups established in 2004
2004 establishments in Saskatchewan